The 2014–15 North Carolina Central Eagles men's basketball team represented North Carolina Central University during the 2014–15 NCAA Division I men's basketball season. The Eagles, led by sixth year head coach LeVelle Moton, played their home games at the McLendon–McDougald Gymnasium and were members of the Mid-Eastern Athletic Conference. They finished the season 25–8, 16–0 in MEAC play to win the MEAC regular season championship. They advanced to the semifinals of the MEAC tournament where they were upset by Delaware State. As a regular season conference champion who failed to win their conference tournament, they received an automatic bid to the National Invitation Tournament where they lost in the first round to Miami (FL).

Roster

Schedule

|-
!colspan=9 style="background:#800000; color:#C0C0C0;"| Regular season

|-
!colspan=9 style="background:#800000; color:#C0C0C0;"|MEAC tournament

|-
!colspan=9 style="background:#800000; color:#C0C0C0;"|NIT

References

North Carolina Central Eagles men's basketball seasons
North Carolina Central
North Carolina Central
North Carolina Central Eagles men's basketball team
North Carolina Central Eagles men's basketball team